Iván López Álvarez (born 29 June 1994), commonly known as Ivi, is a Spanish professional footballer who plays as a forward for Polish club Raków Częstochowa.

Club career

Spain
Born in Madrid, Ivi finished his youth career with local Getafe CF. On 24 February 2013, still a junior, he made his senior debut, coming on as a late substitute for the reserves in a 2–0 home win against Zamora CF in the Segunda División B.

Ivi started the 2013–14 season still with the B-team and in the third division, notably scoring twice in a 3–0 away victory over Real Unión. On 27 March 2014, he made his main squad and La Liga debut, replacing Pablo Sarabia for the final 20 minutes of an eventual 0–1 home loss to Villarreal CF.

On 16 June 2015, Ivi signed a three-year deal with another reserve team, Sevilla Atlético also in the third tier. On 8 October of the following year he scored his first professional goals, netting a brace in a 2–1 home defeat of Real Zaragoza.

On 7 August 2017, Ivi agreed to a four-year contract with top-flight club Levante UD for a reported fee of €1.5 million. He scored his first goal for them on 26 August, through a penalty kick in a 2–2 home draw against Deportivo de La Coruña, and repeated the feat on 9 September to help to a 1–1 draw at title holders Real Madrid.

Ivi was loaned to fellow league side Real Valladolid on 27 July 2018, for one year. The following 31 January, he signed with Sporting de Gijón of division two also in a temporary deal.

On 13 August 2019, Ivi joined SD Huesca on loan for the second-tier season. The following 16 January, however, he left and moved to fellow league team SD Ponferradina just hours later also on loan.

Raków Częstochowa
Ivi terminated his contract with Levante on 28 August 2020, and joined Polish side Raków Częstochowa four days later. He helped them win the Polish Cup in his first season, equalising the 2–1 final victory over Arka Gdynia.

On 17 July 2021, Ivi converted his attempt in Raków's penalty shootout victory against reigning Ekstraklasa champions Legia Warsaw in the Polish Super Cup. The following 2 May, he scored in the final of the domestic cup to help defeat Lech Poznań 3–1 and secure a second consecutive conquest of the tournament.

Career statistics

Honours
Huesca
Segunda División: 2019–20

Raków Częstochowa
Polish Cup: 2020–21, 2021–22
Polish Super Cup: 2021, 2022

Individual
Ekstraklasa Player of the Season: 2021–22
Ekstraklasa top scorer: 2021–22
Ekstraklasa Midfielder of the Season: 2021–22
Ekstraklasa Player of the Month: October 2020, September 2021, April 2022

References

External links

1994 births
Living people
Spanish footballers
Footballers from Madrid
Association football forwards
La Liga players
Segunda División players
Segunda División B players
Getafe CF B players
Getafe CF footballers
Sevilla Atlético players
Levante UD footballers
Real Valladolid players
Sporting de Gijón players
SD Huesca footballers
SD Ponferradina players
Ekstraklasa players
Raków Częstochowa players
Spanish expatriate footballers
Expatriate footballers in Poland
Spanish expatriate sportspeople in Poland